Princess Sophie of Bavaria (Sophie Friederike Dorothea Wilhelmine; 27 January 1805 – 28 May 1872) was the daughter of King Maximilian I Joseph of Bavaria and his second wife, Caroline of Baden. The identical twin sister of Queen Maria Anna of Saxony, Sophie became Archduchess of Austria by marriage to Archduke Franz Karl of Austria. Her eldest son, Franz Joseph, reigned as Emperor of Austria and King of Hungary; her second son, Maximilian, briefly reigned as Emperor of Mexico.

Childhood (1805–1824)

The fourth child of King Maximilian I Joseph of Bavaria and Princess Caroline of Baden, Princess Sophie Friederike Dorothea Wilhelmine was born on 27 January 1805 in Nymphenburg Palace, Munich. She was said to be her father’s favorite daughter although she was more attached to her mother, whom she loved dearly. Sophie adored her twin sister Maria Anna and was very close to all her sisters.

Archduchess of Austria (1824–1872)
On 4 November 1824, she married Archduke Franz Karl of Austria. Her paternal half-sister, Caroline Augusta of Bavaria, had married the groom's widowed father, Francis II, in 1816. Sophie and Franz Karl had six children. Emperor Francis II was truly fond of Sophie. Although Sophie had little in common with her husband she was a caring and devoted wife to Franz Karl who loved and respected her.

Unlike her husband, Sophie was attached to all of her children, especially Franz Joseph, as well as Ferdinand Maximilian, who was her favorite son. She had a reputation for being strong-willed and authoritarian by nature but she was also known as a familiar and sociable person devoted to her family and the Habsburg empire she married into. She enjoyed court life, dance, art and literature as well as horse riding. 

Her ambition to place her oldest son on the Austrian throne was a constant theme in Austrian politics. At the time she was called "the only man at court". During the Revolution of 1848, she persuaded her somewhat feeble-minded husband to give up his rights to the throne in favour of their son Franz Joseph.

After Franz Joseph's accession, Sophie became the power behind the throne. Historically, Sophie is remembered for her extremely adversarial relationship with Franz Joseph's wife Sisi, who was also her niece. Elisabeth hated Sophie for being strict and demanding to her but there is no evidence that the Archduchess had the same feelings towards her niece since she usually described Elisabeth quite pleasantly in her diary and letters.  Nonetheless, she had good relationships with her other daughters-in-law and was a caring mother-in-law to Archduchess Maria Annunziata.

Sophie kept a detailed diary most of her life, which reveals much about Austrian court life. She was deeply affected in 1867 by the execution in Mexico of her second son Maximilian. She never recovered from that shock, and withdrew from public life. She died from pneumonia in 1872.

She was also noted for her close relationship with Napoleon II, who lived at the Austrian Court as the Duke of Reichstadt. There were rumors of a sexual affair between them. There was even suspicion that Maximilian, born two weeks before Reichstadt's death in 1832, was actually his child. These claims were never verified, but it is certain that they were very good friends and that his death affected her very much. She is said to have turned into the hard, ambitious woman described in fiction after he died.

Children

Portrayal on stage and screen

 In the Sissi films (1955–1957), Vilma Degischer played the part of Sophie as a chillingly strict mother-in-law of the young Empress. The stereotype of Sophie as an uptight and spiteful villain seems to have spread from these films.
 In the 1974 miniseries, Fall of Eagles, Sophie was portrayed by English actress Pamela Brown.
 Mayerling, a 1978 ballet by Kenneth MacMillan, features Sophie in a slightly more sympathetic light.
 Elisabeth, a 1992 musical by Michael Kunze about the life of Empress Elisabeth, where Sophie is portrayed as a malevolent intriguer, out to ruin her daughter-in-law's life by any possible means, though more recent productions have somewhat softened her character with additional scenes and a song that give more insight into Sophie's complex motivations and personality.
In Sissi, l'impératrice rebelle, a 2004 French television film, Sophie was played by Stéphane Audran.
In the 2009 European mini-series Sisi, Martina Gedeck portrayed Sophie in one of the more balanced interpretations of the character.
The 2022 Netflix series The Empress features a Sophie played by Melika Foroutan.

Honours 
  : Dame of the Order of the Starry Cross

References

External links 
 
 Historical Boys' Royal Costume: King Maximilian I Joseph: Second Family
 

1805 births
1872 deaths
House of Wittelsbach
House of Habsburg-Lorraine
Austrian princesses
Austrian Roman Catholics
Bavarian princesses
German twins
Burials at the Imperial Crypt
Daughters of kings